A quail-thrush is a bird of the genus Cinclosoma, which contains eight species. Quail-thrushes are in a different family from either quails or thrushes, but bear some superficial resemblance to them. The genus is found in Australia and New Guinea in a variety of habitats ranging from rainforest to deserts. The genus is closely related to the jewel-babblers of New Guinea. Seven species were recognised in 2007. A molecular study published in 2015 by Gaynor Dolman and Leo Joseph resulted in the splitting of the chestnut-backed quail-thrush into the chestnut quail-thrush of eastern Australia and the copperback quail-thrush in the west.

Species

References

 Del Hoyo, J.; Elliot, A. & Christie D. (editors). (2007). Handbook of the Birds of the World. Volume 12: Picathartes to Tits and Chickadees. Lynx Edicions. 

Cinclosomatidae